Abraham Kazen Jr., usually known as Chick Kazen (January 17, 1919 – November 29, 1987), was a U.S. Representative from Texas's 23rd congressional district, the first to serve in that particular position. Elected in 1966, Kazen served until 1985, having been defeated in the 1984 Democratic primary election by Albert G. Bustamante.

Background 

Kazen was of Maronite Lebanese descent, and is related to the powerful Khazen family. He was a lifelong resident of the border city of Laredo.  He graduated in 1937 from Laredo High School, renamed Martin High School. He then attended the University of Texas at Austin from 1937 to 1940. In 1941, Kazen graduated from the Cumberland School of Law in Lebanon, Tennessee, since removed to Birmingham, Alabama.

Military service 

Kazen served in 1942 as a United States Army Air Corps pilot at the since closed Lubbock Air Force Base. During World War II, Kazen fought in North Africa, Sicily, and Italy as a pilot in Troop Carrier Command. He was discharged in 1953 with the rank of captain.

Public service 
In 1946, Kazen was elected to the Texas House of Representatives and served from 1947 to 1953.  He then served in the Texas Senate from 1953 to 1967, and was elected president pro tempore of the State Senate in 1959. He served as acting governor of Texas on August 4, 1959. He was a member of the Texas Legislative Council for sixteen years.

He was elected to Congress as a Democrat in 1966 representing the newly created 23rd District. It was the largest congressional district in area in the nation (excluding at-large districts encompassing whole states), stretching across 800 miles from El Paso in the west to San Antonio in the east. It had been created when Texas' previous congressional map was thrown out by the United States Supreme Court in the case Wesberry v. Sanders. He was reelected eight more times with no substantive opposition.

In 1984, Kazen's opponent in the Democratic primary was Bexar County circuit court judge Albert Bustamante. By this time, the 23rd had become a majority-Hispanic district. Due in part to the demographic changes in the district, Bustamante upset Kazen in the primary, ending Kazen's 39 years as an elected official. After Kazen's defeat, no non-Hispanic white Democrat represented a significant portion of San Antonio in the House until Lloyd Doggett had his Austin-based district redrawn to include a section of San Antonio.

Kazen and his wife, the former Consuelo "Connie" Raymond (1919-2015), a teacher, had five children: Abraham Kazen, III, Norma Kazen, Christina K. Attal and husband, Ronald "Ronny" Kenneth Attal, Sr., Catherine Kazen, and Jo Betsy Kazen, eleven grandchildren and eleven great-grandchildren.

Kazen retired to Laredo after his congressional defeat. He was an uncle of United States District Judge George P. Kazen of Laredo.

Kazen died in Austin, Texas, and is interred beside his wife at Calvary Catholic Cemetery in Laredo.

Kazen is honored through the naming of the Kazen Center, the student union building, at Laredo Community College, Abraham Kazen Middle School, in San Antonio, Texas; and Kazen Elementary School in Laredo.

See also
List of Arab and Middle-Eastern Americans in the United States Congress

References

External links 

 

1919 births
1987 deaths
United States Army personnel of World War II
United States Army officers
United States Air Force officers
American politicians of Lebanese descent
University of Texas at Austin alumni
Cumberland School of Law alumni
Martin High School (Laredo, Texas) alumni
Democratic Party members of the Texas House of Representatives
People from Laredo, Texas
Military personnel from Texas
Texas lawyers
Democratic Party Texas state senators
Democratic Party members of the United States House of Representatives from Texas
20th-century American lawyers
20th-century American politicians
Catholics from Texas
Khazen family